Dragomilići is a village in the municipalities of Kalinovik, Republika Srpska and Foča-Ustikolina, Bosnia and Herzegovina.

Demographics 
According to the 2013 census, its population was 2, both Bosniaks living in the Foča-Ustikolina part, thus none living in the Republika Srpska part.

References

Populated places in Foča-Ustikolina
Populated places in Kalinovik